The 2022 South Korean by-elections will be held in 2 different sessions:

 March 2022 South Korean by-elections - 9 March 2022; along with the presidential election
 June 2022 South Korean by-elections - 1 June 2022; along with the local elections.

References 

2022
2022 elections in South Korea

2022 South Korean by-elections